Pabst Blue Ribbon THC-infused seltzer is a beverage with added THC marketed by Pabst Labs under the Pabst Blue Ribbon brand name since 2020. A review noted that it contains 5 mg of THC per can "meant as a microdose", and induces "a noticeable little buzz".

References

Sources

External links

Cannabis foods
Products introduced in 2020
Pabst Brewing Company